The Wine Institute may refer to:
 Wine Institute (California), an association of wineries in California, United States
 Wine Institute (Greece), a governmental research organization in Greece
 Wine Institute of New Zealand, a former national industry body of New Zealand wineries, known since 2002 as New Zealand Winegrowers
 Australian Wine Research Institute, research body for Australian wine industry
 Institute of Masters of Wine, non-profit making industry association in Great Britain